is a railway station located in Konohana-ku, Osaka, Japan. It is served by the Osaka Loop Line and the Sakurajima Line (JR Yumesaki Line) owned by West Japan Railway Company (JR West) as well as the Hanshin Namba Line owned by Hanshin Electric Railway.

JR West

At Nishikujō Station, regardless of the train type, through trains to/from the Osaka Loop Line and Sakurajima Line trains arrive and depart from center platforms 2 and 3 (there are two platforms on either side of a single central track). Also, some Osaka-bound trains depart from the Loop Line clockwise-bound platform and some Sakurajima-bound trains from the Loop Line counterclockwise platform.

Station layout
There are two island platforms with three tracks elevated.

Adjacent stations

History 
Station numbering was introduced in March 2018 with Noda being assigned station numbers JR-O14 for the Osaka Loop Line and JR-P14 for the Sakurajima Line.

Hanshin Electric Railway

The station opened on 21 May 1964.

Station layout
The station was constructed with the level of tracks which cross over the Osaka Loop Line to schedule to extend to Namba.

The station consists of two elevated side platforms serving a track each. When the station opened, Platform 1 was rarely used while Platform 2 was used for trains bound for Amagasaki. Between 1965 and 1974 when Nishi-Osaka limited express trains were operated, Platform 1 was used for these trains. Until the opening of the Hanshin Namba Line in 2009, the track (platform) was used as the arrival platform from January 23 until February 23.

Adjacent stations

All rapid express trains pass Chidoribashi, Dempo, Fuku, Dekijima, and Daimotsu every day from March 20, 2012, and suburban semi-express trains run to Amagasaki instead.

Surrounding area
Yoshinoya JR Nishikujo
Nishikujo Park
Asahibashi Park, Nishikujo Community Plaza
Creo Osaka West Building
Osaka Municipal Fire Department Konohana Fire Station Nishikujo Branch
Ajikawa Tunnel

Bus service
Operated by Osaka Municipal Transportation Bureau
Nishikujō (West side of Nishikujō Station)
Route 82: for Takami Itchome
Nishikujō (North side of Nishikujō Station)
Route 56: for Torishima Shako-mae via Kasugade and Shimaya / for  via Subway Tamagawa and Fukushima-nishi-dori
Route 79: for Sakurajima Sanchome via Kasugade-minami Nichome and Shimaya
Route 81: for Maishima Sports Island

References 

Konohana-ku, Osaka
Railway stations in Japan opened in 1898
Railway stations in Japan opened in 1964
Railway stations in Osaka
Osaka Loop Line
Stations of Hanshin Electric Railway